Kristoffer Hoven (born 10 August 1996) is a Norwegian football striker who currently plays for Sogndal.

He is a son of the track and field athletes Anders Hoven and Anne-Beth née Espetvedt, and together with his brother Andreas Hoven he signed for Strømsgodset's first team in 2016. He appeared once in the league and once in the cup. In the early summer of 2017 he went on to Hønefoss BK, where he scored double digits. Ahead of the 2019 season he returned to the first tier with Kristiansund BK, only to move on to Sogndal in the summer of 2019.

Career statistics

Club

References

1996 births
Living people
Sportspeople from Drammen
Norwegian footballers
Strømsgodset Toppfotball players
Hønefoss BK players
Kristiansund BK players
Sogndal Fotball players
Eliteserien players
Norwegian First Division players
Association football forwards